Facts of Love is the fifth studio album by American Christian singer-songwriter Kim Boyce, released in 1992. It is Boyce's first album on Warner Music Group's Christian/gospel label Warner Alliance. The album's first single released to both Christian AC and Christian CHR/Pop was "When Love Calls Your Name", which was originally recorded by American actress and singer Cher on her 1991 album Love Hurts. The title song is a cover of the British pop duo Climie Fisher from their 1989 album Coming In for the Kill. Brian Tankersley and musician Bryan Lenox produced five tracks each. The album debuted and peaked at number 16 on the Billboard Top Christian Albums chart.

Track listing

Note: (*) – tracks produced by Brian Tankersley; all other songs produced by Bryan Lenox.

Personnel 

 Kim Boyce – vocals, backing vocals (2, 7, 8, 9)
 Mike Lawler – keyboards (1, 6), Hammond B3 organ (6)
 Bryan Lenox – keyboards (1, 5, 6), backing vocals (4), pipe organ (5), strings (5), bass (5), drums (5), oboe (5)
 Scott Sheriff – keyboards (1)
 Bo Cooper – keyboards (2, 8, 9), acoustic piano (4, 5), additional keyboards (10)
 Trace Scarborough – keyboards (3, 5, 10), bass (3, 10), track arrangements (3, 10)
 Tony Harrell – keyboards (4)
 Phil Madeira – Hammond B3 organ (4)
 Paul Mills – acoustic piano (8)
 Dann Huff – guitars (1, 3, 5, 6)
 Michael Hodge – guitars (2, 10)
 George Cocchini – guitars (4, 7, 9)
 Gordon Kennedy – guitars (6)
 Dale Oliver – guitars (8, 9)
 Mike Brignardello – bass (1)
 Brian Tankersley – bass (2, 7, 8, 9), drums (2, 7, 8, 9), keyboards (7, 8)
 Scott MacLeod – bass (3, 10), drums (3, 10), percussion (3, 10), track arrangements (3, 10)
 Jackie Street – bass (4)
 Tommy Sims – bass (6)
 Mark Hammond – drums (1)
 Steve Brewster – drums (4, 6)
 Eric Darken – percussion (1, 4, 5, 6)
 Marty Paoletta – saxophone solo (3)
 Todd Cooper – saxophone solo (4), backing vocals (4)
 Jeff Kirk – baritone saxophone (4)
 Mark Pogue – backing vocals (1, 5, 6), BGV arrangements (1, 5)
 Chris Rodriguez – backing vocals (1, 2, 4-7)
 Gary Koreiba – backing vocals (2, 4, 6, 10)
 Guy Penrod – backing vocals (2, 7, 10)
 Vicki Hampton – backing vocals (3, 6)
 Carl Lucero – backing vocals (3), BGV arrangements (3)
 Kristina Clark – backing vocals (7)

Production and technical
 Neal Joseph – executive producer (1, 3-6)
 Bryan Lenox – recording (1, 3-6), mixing (1, 3-6)
 Bill Deaton – tracking engineer (1)
 Patrick Kelly – mixing (1, 3-6)
 Brian Tankersley – recording (2, 7-10), mixing (2, 7-10)
 Pasquale Del Villagio – assistant engineer (1, 3-6)
 Amy Hughes – assistant engineer
 Rich Indelicato – assistant engineer (1, 3-6)
 Scott Lenox – assistant engineer (1, 3-6)
 Graham Lewis – assistant engineer (1, 3-6)
 Jeff Neely – assistant engineer (1, 3-6)
 Carry Summers – assistant engineer (1, 3-6)
 Greg Parker – assistant engineer (2, 7-10)
 Hank Williams – mastering at MasterMix (Nashville, Tennessee)
 Julie Johnston – production assistant (1, 3-6)
 Audrey Lenox – production assistant (1, 3-6)
 Joan Tankersley – image stylist 
 Glenn Parsons – design 
 Kevin Break – photography 
 Carter Bradley – hair, make-up 
 Sasser & Cavney Entertainment – management

Charts

Radio singles

References

1992 albums
Kim Boyce albums
Warner Music Group albums